Nadia Medjmedj  (born 20 March 1974) is a Paralympian athlete from Algeria competing mainly in category F56 shot put and discus throw events.

She competed in the 2008 Summer Paralympics in Beijing, China. There, she won a bronze medal in both the women's shot put F57/F58 event and the women's discus throw F57/F58 event.

References

External links 
 
 

1974 births
Living people
Paralympic athletes of Algeria
Paralympic gold medalists for Algeria
Paralympic bronze medalists for Algeria
Athletes (track and field) at the 2004 Summer Paralympics
Athletes (track and field) at the 2008 Summer Paralympics
Athletes (track and field) at the 2012 Summer Paralympics
Athletes (track and field) at the 2016 Summer Paralympics
Athletes (track and field) at the 2020 Summer Paralympics
Medalists at the 2004 Summer Paralympics
Medalists at the 2008 Summer Paralympics
Medalists at the 2016 Summer Paralympics
Paralympic medalists in athletics (track and field)
21st-century Algerian women
Algerian female discus throwers
Algerian javelin throwers
Algerian female shot putters
20th-century Algerian women